This is a list of characters from the Rival Schools series of video games and comic books.

Introduced in Rival Schools: United By Fate

Batsu Ichimonji

 is the main protagonist in both Rival Schools games. In Rival Schools: United by Fate, he is introduced as recently transferred student to Taiyo High searching for his mother. Joined by Hinata and Kyosuke, Batsu finds the person responsible for it is his long-lost father, Raizo. His individual ending in the game reveals he saves his mother and makes peace with his father, once he learn that the latter was brainwashed by his school's own student who orchestrated the event.

In the sequel, Project Justice, Batsu is again the main character, but is dogged by accusations that he is responsible for a new wave of attacks on local schools. The Taiyo High story in the game illustrates two different fates for him; either he fights off the allegation with the help of students from Pacific High School, or disappears for a period of time before returning with increased fighting power. The powered-up Batsu is playable in the game as Burning Batsu.

Batsu was one of two Rival Schools characters (along with Akira) planned to appear in the canceled game Capcom Fighting All-Stars. He is a playable character in Tatsunoko vs. Capcom: Ultimate All-Stars, as well as Street Fighter Online: Mouse Generation, and a solo unit in Project X Zone. Batsu makes a cameo appearance  with Hinata in Capcom vs. SNK 2: Millionaire Fighting 2001, assisting Kyosuke during one of his super combos, and in Iron Fist's ending for Ultimate Marvel vs Capcom 3 as a member of the new Heroes for Hire line-up.

Hinata Wakaba

 first appears in Rival Schools, being the first student to tag along in Batsu's search for his missing mother. During the story, she admits to doing so to help protect her school. In her ending in the game, she finds out her involvement in the searches inspires other students at the school to take up karate, much to her surprise.

In Project Justice, Hinata again joins Batsu and Kyosuke in investigating the new threat to the schools. Her fate in the Taiyo High story varies; in one story she is kidnapped by Kurow and eventually saved by Pacific High School students, or leads Taiyo's investigation in Batsu's absence and is later saved by him when attacked by Kurow.

She makes a cameo with Batsu in Capcom vs. SNK 2: Millionaire Fighting 2001, assisting Kyosuke during one of his super combos, and in Batsu's Ending in Tatsunoko vs. Capcom: Cross Generation of Heroes along with Kyosuke.

Hinata makes another cameo appearance in the background of the Kanzuki Beach stage and Akira's character episode in Street Fighter V, as well as revealing that Hinata inherited Ken Masters' pyrokinetic ability on her own and mastered Ken's fighting style through his online training course.

Kyosuke Kagami

 first debuts in Rival Schools, as a student at Taiyo High who volunteers to help Batsu find his mother. It is later revealed that Kyosuke is behind the kidnapping and was working for his twin brother, Hyo. Ultimately, Kyosuke changes allegiances, and helps Batsu and Hinata in defeating Hyo, while convincing Hyo that force was not the way to achieve their dreams.

In Project Justice, Kyosuke becomes concerned when he meets Kurow Kirishima and sense the power helping him. When Hyo is later possessed by the spirit of the brothers' father, Kyosuke reluctantly fights his brother again. After the apparent death of Hyo, Kyosuke disappears, with his friends at Taiyo High waiting for him to return to school.

Outside of the Rival Schools games, Kyosuke also is a playable character in Capcom vs. SNK 2. One of his super moves in that game includes cameos by Batsu and Hinata.

Hayato Nekketsu

 is a physical education teacher at Taiyo High. He first appears in the PlayStation version of Rival Schools: United By Fate, as a bonus character. In that game, his plot is to find the source of the school abductions, as he believes the students are unable to do so themselves. In Project Justice, he joins fellow teachers Hideo and Kyoko in investigating the new set of kidnappings a year later. He likes red jerseys, fighting spirit and attractive women (this includes fellow teacher Kyoko, which causes a heated rivalry with Hideo); he dislikes bad manners, laziness, and things that his mother and father never found to be important, and he seems to love corporal punishment as his main weapon is a kendo sword that he hits opponents with. He has black hair with thick eyebrows, and is dressed in a red track suit with a white shirt and sneakers. His last name, Nekketsu, literally means "hot-blooded" in Japanese - a perfect description of his personality.

Hayato was designed by Kazuhiko Shimamoto.

Chairperson

In the ending, Chairperson is referred to as Class Leader. The School Life modes in Rival Schools and Nekketsu Seisyun Nikki 2 expand on her character a bit more. Her real name is undisclosed in the games, as she prefers to go by the "name" she uses in the student government of her school. She has long raven hair with a red hairband, and her primary outfit is a Taiyo High physical education uniform, complete with bright red sports jacket, black underwear/bloomers and white sneakers.

She makes her first playable appearance in Project Justice, working together with Ran and the students of Pacific High School to find out the cause of the recent school violence and abductions.

She is also revealed to have been using Dan Hibiki's Saikyo-Style Martial Arts via online training.

Shoma Sawamura

 is a student and baseball player from Gorin High, first appearing in Rival Schools. In that game, he searches for persons responsible for injuring his older brother and fellow baseball player, Shuichi, and joins Natsu and Roberto when he finds they are doing similar investigations. Though his fate varies on the characters selected in the game, Nagare's ending in Nekketsu Seisyun Nikki 2 reveals that Shoma is captured and brainwashed by Justice High School before being freed by Nagare.

In Project Justice, Shoma ends up befriending Momo after she is the apparent victim of an attack by Batsu. However, Momo's insistence that he help her separates him from his friends Natsu and Roberto. After helping her in a number of scuffles, Shoma is betrayed by Momo and finds out she used him to help cause confusion among the various schools. He eventually reunites and reconciles with his friends.

Natsu Ayuhara

 is a student and volleyball player from Gorin High, first appearing in Rival Schools. Her motivation in the game is to find the persons responsible for the attacks on Gorin, which included members of the school volleyball club. She joins Shoma and Roberto in similar investigations, although she frequently argues with Shoma over how to go about it.

In Project Justice, Natsu is shown as suspicious of new student Momo, and disagrees with Shoma when he believes that they should help Momo out. After Shoma leaves to investigate on his own with Momo, Natsu joins Roberto and Nagare in looking for the culprits of the new school disturbance. Later, she is the first to welcome back Shoma after he is betrayed by Momo.

Roberto Miura

 is a student and soccer player from Gorin High, first appearing in Rival Schools. Although he's one-quarter Brazilian, Roberto's a Japanese national. He joins Shoma and Natsu in their investigations on the attacks on their school, although he serves mostly as a moderator for the disagreements between Shoma and Natsu. His ending shows he breaks his arm during their investigation, which worries him as he cannot play his favored position of goalkeeper, but a scout offers a chance to play as a forward instead.

In Project Justice, Roberto ends up between another fight between Shoma and Natsu, this time on whether to investigate who attacked Momo. After Shoma leaves with Momo, Roberto joins Natsu and Nagare in investigating the new disturbances going on at the schools. The Gorin High ending has him, along with Nagare, commenting on the newly forming love triangle between Shoma, Natsu and Momo.

Akira Kazama

 is a character introduced in Rival Schools: United by Fate. Her initial appearance in the game is under a motorcycle helmet and a biker gear, posing as a boy in order to find out what happened to her older brother, Daigo. She befriends two of his subordinates, Edge and Gan and they eventually rescue Daigo, where Akira's true identity is revealed to the characters and player. An alternate version of Akira without the helmet and suit is playable in Rival Schools, but maintains the same ending as masked Akira.

In Project Justice, Akira is revealed to have been transferred to the girls-only Seijyun High. In the Seijyun storyline, Akira is the central character, with the player following her quest to find out what happened to her brother. Unlike in Rival Schools, Akira starts off without her motorcycle helmet disguise, but can unlock it after playing through a certain storyline in the game.

Akira, along with Batsu, was slated to appear in the canceled Capcom Fighting All-Stars, as well as originally going to appear in Marvel vs. Capcom: Infinite.

She appears as a playable character via downloadable content in Street Fighter V, where she is revealed to have finally overcome her aquaphobia, thanks to Gorin University's alumni, Nagare.

Edge

, full name , is a student from Gedo High School and member of the school's gang, introduced in Rival Schools: United By Fate. His most distinguishing features are his blonde hair, usually styled into tall spikes, his purple clothes, and his use of knives when fighting.

In Rival Schools, Edge is one of the Gedo students who joins a disguised Akira in finding the whereabouts of Gedo's gang leader, Daigo. Though Edge is initially suspecting of Akira, and even engages, with Gan's assistance, a fight with her, he eventually comes to accept her, especially after she reveals her true gender. His ending has him initially choosing to stop picking fights with other children, but changes his mind at the urging of several of his classmates.

In Project Justice, Edge becomes suspicious when a returning Daigo has him and Gan performing various, irrational attacks against other schools. Through the help of Akira and her friends at Seijyun High, the Gedo students break Daigo out of his brainwashing. The Gedo High ending in the game reveals that Edge is named one of the leaders of the Gedo gang after Daigo leaves to train.

Gan Isurugi

 is a student from Gedo High and member of the school's gang, introduced in Rival Schools: United By Fate. In Rival Schools, Gan is one of the Gedo gang member who joins Akira in investigating what happened to Daigo. Like Edge, he is initially distrustful of Akira, but eventually accepts her as part of the gang even after she reveals her true identity. His ending has him inspired by his experiences to begin studying hard in class, albeit without much success.

In Project Justice, Gan's role is much similar to Edge's, with both being used to attack random schools and eventually help the gang leader break free of his brainwashing. The Gedo high ending reveals that Gan was the other gang member appointed to lead the gang in Daigo's absence.

Daigo Kazama

 is a student of Gedo High and the leader of the school's gang. He first appears in the arcade version of Rival Schools: United By Fate in Akira's ending, and is first playable in the PlayStation port of the game. In Rival Schools, Daigo has no set story in single player mode, although it is explained he set out alone to find the person responsible for the school kidnappings. His ending in the game reveals that he was defeated and brainwashed by Hyo Imawano, and was later freed by Akira, Edge and Gan in Akira's ending.

In Project Justice, Daigo is the central character in the Gedo High story. After returning from a trip that takes place between Rival Schools and Project Justice, Daigo begins ordering his gang to attack random schools, much to the reluctance of Edge and Gan. When Daigo orders an attack on Seijyun High, Edge and Gan work with Akira and her Seiyjun classmates to stop him. It is then revealed that Daigo was brainwashed by Kurow Kirishima in order to create discord between the schools. The Gedo High story has two ending in the game which portray different fates for Daigo - the canon ending has him break free of his brainwashing and take a leave of absence to reflect on himself, while the non-canon ending has him succumb to injuries from fighting. The brainwashed Daigo is playable in Project Justice, as the character Wild Daigo.

Daigo appear as Akira's assist character in Street Fighter V.

Roy Bromwell

 is a character first introduced in Rival Schools: United By Fate. A rich foreign exchange student from the United States, he is often portrayed in the games as main character Batsu's rival. He is also an American football player, with a number of his in-game special moves named after elements of the sport.

In the first game, he is ordered to investigate the school kidnappings by his father, with Tiffany and Boman joining him. During their investigation, the American trio is defeated and brainwashed to the service of Justice High, but eventually is freed thanks to Batsu and his Taiyo High compatriots. This causes Roy eventually rethink his ideas about Japan and its people. His ending in the game has him return to the United States determined to change the way of thinking in his home country, and 30 years after the games take place, he is elected the President of the United States.

In Project Justice, Roy, along with Tiffany, returns to Japan when the new school conflict breaks out. They show up in two of the storylines in the game; either helping Batsu and his friends in the Taiyo High story, or joining up with Boman in the Pacific High story. The Pacific High ending has him return to the United States with Tiffany, more determined to change the world.

Tiffany Lords

 is a wealthy student from Pacific High, also from the United States. Her story in Rival Schools: United By Fate has her joining Roy in his investigation of the school kidnappings, due to her crush on him. Like her classmates, she is captured and brainwashed by Justice High, but is eventually freed by students from Taiyo High. Her ending has her return to the United States with Roy, and setting out to train as a bodyguard after Roy begins his studies in politics.

In Project Justice, Tiffany joins Roy in returning to Japan to investigate the new crisis in the country. Like Roy, she also appears in either the Taiyo High story, where she saves Hinata from capture, or the Pacific High story. She also returns to the United States in the Pacific High ending, setting out to help Roy in achieving his goals.

Tiffany makes a cameo appearance in Deadpool's ending in Ultimate Marvel vs. Capcom 3, where she can be seen asking for his autograph after he kills Galactus.

Tiffany makes another cameo appearance in the background of the Kanzuki Beach stage and Akira's character episode in Street Fighter V.

Boman Delgado

 is a student from Pacific High from the United States. He is training to be a preacher, and many of his moves in the games introduce some Christian imagery, mostly crosses.

In Rival Schools, Boman joins Roy and Tiffany in their investigation of the kidnappings, albeit reluctantly due to his non-violent nature. He too is captured and brainwashed by Justice High, and eventually freed by Taiyo High students. This act inspires Boman, as in his ending, he stays in Japan to better understand Japanese culture and bridge the difference between Japan and the US.

In Project Justice, Boman is the central character of the Pacific High story, having set out to find the person responsible for disrupting an inter-school athletic competition. He is joined in the investigation by two Taiyo High students, Ran and chairperson, and later his classmates Roy and Tiffany. The Pacific High ending has him again stay in Japan to help improve relations between the US and Japan.

Hideo Shimazu

 first appears in Rival Schools, introduced as a Japanese language teacher and former heir to Shimazuk-Style Karate who is sent along with Kyoko to recruit students to the school. The game's story has Hideo eventually brainwashed by the school's own student through its brainwashed principal, and forced to bring in students to the school, but is snapped out of the brainwashing by students from Taiyo High School. Hideo's story has him show some concern for Kyoko and his ending, he proposes to her.

In Project Justice, he and Kyoko, along with fellow teacher Hayato Nekketsu, investigate who is responsible for the new attacks on the school and eventually discover that a student at Justice, Kurow, is responsible. In story mode, Hideo is playable in the Justice High School, with the ending showing him hospitalized from the investigation (although a specific explanation to why is never given).

Outside the Rival Schools games, Hideo appears alongside Kyoko as playable characters in the cross-over strategy RPG Namco × Capcom.

Kyoko Minazuki

 is a school nurse and later chemistry teacher at Justice High School. In Rival Schools, she is sent along with Hideo to recruit students to the school. Like Hideo, she end up being brainwashed to do the school's bidding, when they notice shady activities within the school they work for,  until they are freed by students from Taiyo High. In her ending in the game, the values she gains from the ordeal moves her to convict a former employer for corruption, and she eventually accepts Hideo's marriage proposal.

In Project Justice, Kyoko appears with Hideo and Hayato in the Justice High storyline, investigating the cause of the new school attacks. In the story's ending, she is shown taking care of Hideo and reminding him of their wedding.

Kyoko also appears as a playable character in Namco × Capcom alongside Hideo.

Raizo Imawano

 first appears in Rival Schools: United by Fate and is initially portrayed as the main antagonist in the game. The principal of Justice High, most of the games cutscenes show him as the organizer of the events that take place in the game and reveal that he is the father of Batsu. However, the "true" ending to the game reveal Raizo was working under the orders of Hyo, his nephew who brainwashed him as well as most of the student body. Raizo is a hidden character in the game and his ending shows him atoning for his actions and returns to his family.

In Project Justice, Raizo is not playable, but makes a few appearances in the game's Story Mode. An attack on him by Kurow is the catalyst for the events of the game's story, and he also makes an appearance in the Taiyo High story mode, where he revealed the evil spirit who possessed Hyo is his late-brother, Mugen Iwamano; then last seen in Teacher Tean/Justice High ending, where he slept at the same hospital room next to Hideo's hospital bed, and overhearing a marriage plan between both Hideo and Kyoko.

Hyo Imawano

 first appears in Rival Schools: United by Fate as the final boss of the game. Revealed through the player meeting certain requirements during a fight with Raizo, Hyo is shown as the mastermind behind the events of the game's story, with his goal to take over Japan. Hyo is ultimately defeated by students from Taiyo High School, which include his twin brother Kyosuke. Hyo is also playable in the game, with his ending showing him successful in his plans but regretting having to defeat Kyosuke in doing so. However, this ending is not canonical.

In Project Justice, Hyo appears as the final boss of the game, but is not the main antagonist. In most of the game's Story Mode, he initially appears to defeat Kurow Kirishima, who had been shown brainwashing Hyo earlier in the storyline. Afterwards, he is shown being taken over by his father's spirit, where he becomes Demon Hyo, the final boss of the game. Again he is defeated by Kyosuke, but dies from the fight. He was voiced by Kaneto Shiozawa, who had died in May 2000, which is why they killed Hyo off.

Sakura Kasugano

A Street Fighter character who debuted in Street Fighter Alpha 2,  makes a guest appearance in Rival Schools: United By Fate, which serves as a prequel to Street Fighter Alpha 2. She has no actual storyline show in single-player mode of the game, although she does have a proper ending after beating the final boss in the game. The in-game story establishes her as childhood friends with Hinata Wakaba and Natsu Ayuhara, and states her to be a student from Tamagawa-Minami High (in the Street Fighter games, it was never specified in which school she studied).

By the time after Street Fighter IV, starting from Street Fighter V, Sakura graduates from school.

Introduced in Nekketsu Seisyun Nikki 2

Ran Hibiki

 is a student at Taiyo High who is working toward a career in journalism.  She is the editor in chief of the school's newspaper. She investigates the kidnappings and disappearances, seeking to scoop an exclusive news story. In Project Justice, she works with chairperson and students from Pacific High School to find the ones responsible for creating havoc between the schools. Her name is a play on Dan Hibiki from Street Fighter, it has been speculated they are related but there is no confirmation, despite Dan mentioning he has a sister in the NeoGeo Pocket Color title, SNK vs. Capcom: Match of the Millennium.

Nagare Namikawa

 is a 3rd-year student and swimmer from Gorin High. His story explains he is a childhood friend of Shoma, and sets out to find him after he disappears from the school. Though he has no story cutscenes, his ending shows him freeing Shoma from the control of Justice High School. In Project Justice, he is a first member of the school's first university branch, Gorin University. In the game's plot, he joins Natsu and Roberto to investigate the new school attacks after Shoma separates from the group. He makes an appearance in the Gorin High ending, commenting with Roberto on Shoma, Natsu, and Momo.

Introduced in Project Justice

Momo Karuizawa

 is a student and tennis player from Gorin High, first appearing in Project Justice. She appears in the Gorin storyline as the apparent victim of bullying by Batsu, and appeals to the students of the school to help her, getting Shoma to join her in getting back at Batsu. It is later revealed that she is actually working for Kurow Kirishima, and that her actions were to distract Shoma and his friends. She is betrayed by Kurow at the end of the Gorin story, however.  The Gorin ending also reveals she develops a legitimate crush on Shoma, much to the chagrin of Natsu.

Yurika Kirishima

 is one of two Seijyun High characters introduced in Project Justice, where she is introduced to the player as a high-class girl who fights with her violin. In the game's story mode, she was friends with Akira and befriends Zaki, but is also shown in several other storylines to be doing so at the orders of her brother, Kurow. She is later shown admitting to helping her brother's plans and betrays him to join her friends. The Seijyun High ending shows her having disappeared from school out of guilt for her actions, but she later returns (much to the pleasure of Akira).

Yurika alongside Zaki and Akira appear in the Street Fighter: Back To School Special comic where Yurika fights Karin Kazuniki from the opposite franchise to great success before the fight is stopped by Sarai and Kei.

Zaki

, real name , is a female gang leader introduced in Project Justice. Zaki is introduced at the beginning of the Seijyun High School storyline, being asked by Akira and Yurika to help investigate the strange behavior of Akira's brother, Daigo. She is shown to be highly confrontational, showing anger at an attack by Batsu Ichimonji and snapping at the teacher trio of Hideo, Kyoko and Hayato when the girls are questioned about the confrontation, but is also seen as forgiving when Yurika reveals herself to be working for Kurow Kirishima, the person who brainwashed Daigo, Zaki is at first reluctant to forgive her, but changes her mind when Akira forgives Yurika anyway.

Zaki appears alongside Yurika and Akira in the Street Fighter: Back To School Special comic where she fights against Ibuki from the opposite franchise. Zaki has the least success out of the Rival Schools girls against their individual opponents before the fight is stopped by Sarai and Kei.

Kurow Kirishima

 is the main antagonist of Project Justice, but this is not revealed until later on in the story. His actions include either attacking various groups of students with his lackeys - his sister Yurika, Momo, and a brainwashed Daigo - or having them do his dirty work for him.

At a certain point, Kurow unveils himself as the mastermind behind the recent upheaval among the schools. He explains that he is sent by the ninja clan the Imawano family was a part of to assassinate Batsu, Raizo, Kyosuke, and Hyo. After being defeated by the group of students selected by the player, he attempts to send a brainwashed Hyo Imawano after the players, only to be betrayed and defeated by Hyo. The sequence following the final fight in story mode reveals Kurow is hospitalized after the attack, but escapes after a few days.

A bonus storyline available in Project Justice, the Darkside Student Council, tells an alternate story in which Kurow's plans to take over the various schools succeeds. The ending for this story has him at the head of Justice High School, shown with the various characters of the series as his brainwashed servants, including his own sister.

See also 
 Rival Schools: United By Fate
 Project Justice

References 

Rival Schools
Rival Schools
Rival Schools
Lists of video game characters